Khezr Beyg (also Romanized as Kheẕr Beyg and Khazar Beyg) is a village in Takab Rural District, Kuhsorkh County, Razavi Khorasan Province, Iran. At the 2006 census, its population was 1,158, in 289 families.

References 

Populated places in Kuhsorkh County